The Gator Bowl is an annual college football bowl game held in Jacksonville, Florida, operated by Gator Bowl Sports. It has been held continuously since 1946, making it the sixth oldest college bowl, as well as the first one ever televised nationally. The game was originally played at Gator Bowl Stadium through the December 1993 game. The December 1994 game was played at Ben Hill Griffin Stadium in Gainesville after the namesake stadium was demolished to make way for a replacement venue, Jacksonville Municipal Stadium. That venue, now known as TIAA Bank Field, has been home to the Gator Bowl since the January 1996 game.

The game has been sponsored by TaxSlayer.com since 2012, and starting with the 2018 edition is officially known as the TaxSlayer Gator Bowl. From 2015 to 2017, it was officially referred to as simply the TaxSlayer Bowl. Previous sponsors include Progressive Insurance (2011), Konica Minolta (2008–2010), Toyota (1995–2007), Outback Steakhouse (1992–1994), and Mazda (1986–1991).

History
According to writer Anthony C. DiMarco, Charles Hilty Sr. first conceived of the event. Hilty, together with Ray McCarthy, Maurice Cherry, and W. C. Ivey, put up $10,000 to underwrite the first game, which was held at Jacksonville's football stadium, Fairfield Stadium, on January 1, 1946.

The first two years of the event did not sell out the small capacity stadium, drawing only 7,362 to the 1946 game when the Wake Forest Demon Deacons defeated the South Carolina Gamecocks, 26–14. The stadium was expanded in 1948 and renamed the Gator Bowl Stadium in honor of the event. However, it was not until the 1949 matchup between the Clemson Tigers and the Missouri Tigers that the future of the Gator Bowl was assured: the 1948 attendance of 16,666 for a 20–20 tie between Maryland and Georgia was nearly doubled with 32,939 watching Clemson squeak by Missouri, 24–23, on a late field goal by Jack Miller.

By the 1970s, the attendance regularly reached 60,000–70,000.

Hotel Roosevelt fire in 1963

The Gator Bowl is one of Jacksonville's annual sports highlights. However, the event was once associated with a tragedy. In the early morning of December 29, 1963, the Hotel Roosevelt in downtown Jacksonville caught fire after a post-Gator Bowl party in the ballroom. It was later determined that the party was not the cause of the fire, and that the timing was a coincidence. The fire resulted in 22 deaths.

Woody Hayes incident in 1978

In the 1978 game between Ohio State and Clemson, Ohio State coach Woody Hayes lost his temper after a late game interception by Clemson nose guard Charlie Bauman, who stepped in front of the receiver on a pass from quarterback Art Schlichter. Bauman ran the ball out of bounds on the Ohio State sideline where Hayes struck Bauman with his right forearm. The play sealed the Tigers' 17–15 win over the Buckeyes, while Hayes was fired the next day before leaving Jacksonville.

Bowden's Last Stand in 2010
In the 2010 game between Florida State and West Virginia, Florida State coach Bobby Bowden (who previously coached at West Virginia) coached the final game of his career. Bowden had been the head coach at Florida State since 1976 and had won two national championships, 13 ACC championships, and had a 14-year streak of top five finishes during that time.  A record crowd of over 84,000 people witnessed Bowden being carried off the field after a 33–21 Florida State victory.

TaxSlayer sponsorship

In 2014, Gator Bowl Sports announced the bowl would be renamed the TaxSlayer Bowl following a new six-year deal with tax preparation company TaxSlayer.com. As a result of the deal, the bowl increased its payout and moved to a new time slot on January 2 for 2015 and 2016. A new logo was released on April 3, 2014. For the December 2018 contest, "Gator" was reinstated in the name for the first time since 2015, with the bowl being called the TaxSlayer Gator Bowl.

Venues
The 1946 and 1947 games were played in Fairfield Stadium, which had a seating capacity of 7,600. The stadium was expanded to 16,000 seats in 1948, and the structure was renamed the Gator Bowl. Prior to the 1949 game, the seating capacity was expanded to 36,058, at which it remained until 1957. That stadium hosted the game through 1993, when it was almost completely demolished for the construction of Jacksonville Municipal Stadium on the same site. During construction, the December 1994 game was played at Ben Hill Griffin Stadium in Gainesville, Florida. The January 1996 game, and all subsequent games to date, have been held at Jacksonville Municipal Stadium, currently known as TIAA Bank Field.

Organization
The game and associated activities are overseen by Gator Bowl Sports. Founded as the Gator Bowl Association in 1945, the organization expanded in 2013 to branch into other sports and events and increase its charity wing.

The association comprises 225 Gator Bowl Committee members, 84 Chairman's Club members and sponsors, more than 700 volunteers, plus over a dozen paid staff members. In addition to the Gator Bowl, the GBA has also coordinated other events. It hosted the ACC Championship Game from 2005 to 2007 and the River City Showdown, a neutral site game between the Florida State Seminoles and another team, in 2007 and 2008.

Teams typically featured

In the early years of the bowl, from 1946–1952, it featured a team from the Southern Conference against an at-large opponent. Beginning with the 1953 game, it switched to generally featuring a Southeastern Conference (SEC) team against an at-large opponent. From 1953 to the 1975 game, at least one SEC team appeared in 20 out of the 24 games, and in three of those games both teams were from the SEC. The games from 1976 to 1995 usually, but not always, involved a team from the southeastern United States against a team from another part of the country. Teams from the Atlantic Coast Conference (ACC) played in ten of these 20 games.

From 1996–2006, the Gator Bowl traditionally hosted the second-place ACC team against the second-place Big East Conference team. With the 2007 game, the ACC runner-up became contractually tied to play in the Chick-fil-A Bowl and the Gator Bowl began hosting the third-place ACC team versus a team from either the Big East (still the conference's #2 team unless they qualified for the Bowl Championship Series), the Big 12 Conference, or the unaffiliated Notre Dame Fighting Irish (who would take the Big East's spot in this game). The contract, which ran for four years, was held in conjunction with the Sun Bowl, with the Gator Bowl receiving first choice of teams, and required both bowls to take Big East teams twice and Big 12 teams twice. Since the previous two Gator Bowls featured the Texas Tech Red Raiders and the Nebraska Cornhuskers, both Big 12 teams, a Big East team or Notre Dame would play in the 2010 Gator Bowl per the terms of the contract (West Virginia lost to Florida State in this game).

The conference alignment changed again in 2010, as the Big East and Notre Dame moved their hybrid arrangement to the Champs Sports Bowl for 2010, while the Gator Bowl declined to renew its contract with the Big 12.  The Gator Bowl would feature the SEC and the Big Ten Conference starting with the 2010 season, joining the Capital One Bowl and the Outback Bowl as the third Big Ten-SEC bowl matchup on New Year's Day. Starting in 2015, the bowl returned to a hybrid arrangement for a six-year period, with SEC teams playing ACC teams for three years and Big Ten teams the other three years; the Notre Dame Fighting Irish are also eligible during ACC years.

Through 74 playings (the 2018 edition), 38 have been contested with both teams ranked (per the AP Poll), most recently the 2006 edition. The highest ranked team to appear was No. 3 Pittsburgh in the 1980 edition.

Title sponsors
Mazda was the first title sponsor, beginning in 1986 and lasting for five years. Outback Steakhouse sponsored the Gator Bowl for three years beginning in 1992, prior to obtaining their own Outback Bowl held in Tampa, Florida. From 1996–2006, the title sponsor was Toyota. Konica Minolta then became the sponsor from 2007 to 2010. On December 14, 2010, the Gator Bowl Association announced that Progressive Insurance would become the title sponsor for the 2011 Gator Bowl. On September 1, 2011, GBA announced a multi-year title sponsorship deal with TaxSlayer.com.

Game results
All rankings are taken from the AP Poll prior to the game being played. Italics denote a tie game.

Source:

MVPs
From 1946 through 1952, a single MVP was named. Starting with the 1953 game, MVPs are named for each team; in several instances, co-MVPs have been named for a team.

Most appearances
Updated through the December 2022 edition (78 games, 156 appearances).

Teams with multiple appearances

Teams with a single appearance
Won (4): LSU, Northwestern, Vanderbilt, Wyoming

Lost (9): Air Force, Colorado, Indiana, Michigan State, Rutgers, Stanford, Texas, Tulsa, Washington & Lee

Appearances by conference
Updated through the December 2022 edition (78 games, 156 appearances).

 Games marked with an asterisk (*) were played in January of the following calendar year.
 Records reflect conference affiliations at the time each game was played.
 Conferences that are defunct or no longer active in FBS are marked in italics.
 The Big Eight's record includes appearances when the conference was known as the Big Six and Big Seven.
 Big East teams made 12 appearances and were 4–8; the American Athletic Conference (The American) retains the conference charter following the 2013 split of the original Big East along football lines.
 Two teams from the same conference have met five times: 1945*, 1955, 1958, 1969, and 1970*. The first instance was SoCon teams, while the others have been SEC teams.
 Two independent teams have met four times: 1967, 1976, 1980, and 1982.
 Independent appearances (23): Air Force (1963), Florida State (1964*, 1967, 1982, 1985), Georgia Tech (1965), Miami-FL (1951*), Notre Dame (1976, 1998*, 2002*, 2022), Penn State (1961, 1962, 1967, 1976), Pitt (1956, 1977, 1980), South Carolina (1980, 1984, 1987), Syracuse (1966), and West Virginia (1982, 1989).
 Every current member of the SEC has appeared in at least one Gator Bowl.  Former member Georgia Tech has also appeared, former member Tulane has not. 
 Seven former members of the Big East appeared in the bowl, though not all while in the Big East: Louisville, Miami-FL, Pitt, Rutgers, Syracuse, Virginia Tech, and West Virginia.  Five members have not: Boston College, Cincinnati, UConn, USF and Temple. 
 Twelve current members of the ACC have appeared in the bowl, though not all while in the ACC: Clemson, Florida State, Georgia Tech, Louisville, Miami-FL, UNC, NC State, Pitt, Syracuse, Virginia, Virginia Tech, and Wake Forest, as have two former members (Maryland and South Carolina).  Two members (Boston College and Duke) have yet to appear in the bowl.

Gator Bowl Hall of Fame
The Gator Bowl created a Hall of Fame in 1989; new members were announced annually through 2013, with a total of 82 inductees at that time. After 2013, additions have occurred intermittently.

75th Anniversary All Gator Bowl Team
In September 2019, bowl organizers announced an All Gator Bowl Team, in commemoration of the 75th anniversary game, played in January 2020.

Game records

Source:

Media coverage

The longtime broadcaster of the game was ABC, which showed the game in prime time from 1974 through 1985. Turner Sports bought the rights to the game after the 1991 match-up and TBS became the home of the Gator Bowl for the next four years, moving back to a late December date. The game returned to New Year's Day after NBC bought the rights to the Gator Bowl in 1996. CBS Sports took over the television contract in 2007 and held the rights for four years. ESPN purchased the rights to the game following its 2010 playing and the 2011 Gator Bowl aired on ESPN2; with the acquisition of the Gator Bowl the ESPN family of networks became the home of every New Year's Day bowl game (the network already had the rights to the Outback, Capital One, and Rose bowls and acquired the rights to the TicketCity Bowl and the remainder of the BCS games).

Television

Radio

Local radio

Notes

References

External links
 

 
College football bowls
Recurring sporting events established in 1946
Sports competitions in Jacksonville, Florida
1946 establishments in Florida
American football in Jacksonville, Florida